Maharaja Sir Madho Rao Scindia of Gwalior  (20 October 1876 – 5 June 1925), was the 5th Maharaja of Gwalior belonging to the Scindian dynasty of the Marathas.

Biography

Madho Rao acceded to the throne in 1886 and ruled until his death in 1925. He was noted by the British Government as a progressive ruler of a princely state. He was married twice, but only had children with his second wife in 1913, one son and one daughter, to whom King George V and Queen Mary stood sponsors.  He was succeeded by his son, Maharajdhiraja Maharaja Sir George Jivaji Rao Scindia, 6th Maharaja Scindia of Gwalior. His daughter married, but died without children in 1934.

The Maharaja of Gwalior is also known as the rejected suitor of Gayatri Devi's mother, the glamorous Princess Indira of Baroda (Indira Devi), who broke off her engagement (contracted between her parents and her fiance) by letter. The Maharaja then married Gajararaje from the Rane family of Goa. Later on, Gajararaje's sisters were married into the notable Sardar families of Gwalior, which included the Angre, Shitole & the Mahadik Families.

The Maharaja received a number of honours and decorations from the United Kingdom and other Indian States. He was appointed Honorary Aide-de-camp to King Edward VII in 1901, in recognition of his support during the Boxer Rebellion in China. In May of the following year, he received the honorary degree LL.D. from the University of Cambridge.

An interesting story is that Madho Rao, the Maharajah of Gwalior, helped to fund the completion of a set of mosaics in the Church of the Ascension in Timoleague, County Cork, Ireland. The mosaics are of particular note, begun in 1894 by Mr. Robert Augustus Travers of Timoleague House in memory of family members, continued in 1918 by his son Robert in commemoration of his father and brother who were killed at Gallipoli. The last phase of the mosaics was at the expense of the Maharajah of Gwalior, installed as a memorial to his friend and physician, Lt. Col Crofts IMS from Councamore (near Timoleague), who had saved the life of his son. The mosaic was completed by Italian workmen in 1925, ten years after the doctor's death. The mosaic, most likely designed by the Church of Ireland architect W.H. Hill, is a blend of the European and the Islamic. The series of stained glass windows include a Warrington over the altar (east window), glass by Lavers, Westlake and also Mayer elsewhere. The architect Jeremy Williams wrote in "A Companion Guide to Architecture in Ireland 1837-1921" that "this building was a monument to a living friendship enshrined in a hidden masterpiece of the Arts and Crafts Movement in Ireland" and that it "transcended the sectarian divide between Irish Catholic and Protestant, the Indian Muslim and Hindu, personal friendship breaking up distinctions of caste and colour."

Titles

1876-1886: Yuvaraja Maharaj Shrimant Madho Rao Scindia Bahadur
1886-1895: His Highness Ali Jah, Umdat ul-Umara, Hisam us-Sultanat, Mukhtar ul-Mulk, Azim ul-Iqtidar, Rafi-us-Shan, Wala Shikoh, Muhtasham-i-Dauran, Maharajadhiraj Maharaja Shrimant Madho Rao Scindia Bahadur, Shrinath, Mansur-i-Zaman, Fidvi-i-Hazrat-i-Malika-i-Mua'zzama-i-Rafi-ud-Darja-i-Inglistan, Maharaja Scindia of Gwalior
1895-1898: His Highness Ali Jah, Umdat ul-Umara, Hisam us-Sultanat, Mukhtar ul-Mulk, Azim ul-Iqtidar, Rafi-us-Shan, Wala Shikoh, Muhtasham-i-Dauran, Maharajadhiraj Maharaja Shrimant Sir Madho Rao Scindia Bahadur, Shrinath, Mansur-i-Zaman, Fidvi-i-Hazrat-i-Malika-i-Mua'zzama-i-Rafi-ud-Darja-i-Inglistan, Maharaja Scindia of Gwalior, GCSI
1898-1900: Colonel His Highness Ali Jah, Umdat ul-Umara, Hisam us-Sultanat, Mukhtar ul-Mulk, Azim ul-Iqtidar, Rafi-us-Shan, Wala Shikoh, Muhtasham-i-Dauran, Maharajadhiraj Maharaja Shrimant Sir Madho Rao Scindia Bahadur, Shrinath, Mansur-i-Zaman, Fidvi-i-Hazrat-i-Malika-i-Mua'zzama-i-Rafi-ud-Darja-i-Inglistan, Maharaja Scindia of Gwalior, GCSI
1900-1902: Colonel His Highness Ali Jah, Umdat ul-Umara, Hisam us-Sultanat, Mukhtar ul-Mulk, Azim ul-Iqtidar, Rafi-us-Shan, Wala Shikoh, Muhtasham-i-Dauran, Maharajadhiraj Maharaja Shrimant Sir Madho Rao Scindia Bahadur, Shrinath, Mansur-i-Zaman, Fidvi-i-Hazrat-i-Malika-i-Mua'zzama-i-Rafi-ud-Darja-i-Inglistan, Maharaja Scindia of Gwalior, GCSI
1902-1910: Colonel His Highness Ali Jah, Umdat ul-Umara, Hisam us-Sultanat, Mukhtar ul-Mulk, Azim ul-Iqtidar, Rafi-us-Shan, Wala Shikoh, Muhtasham-i-Dauran, Maharajadhiraj Maharaja Shrimant Sir Madho Rao Scindia Bahadur, Shrinath, Mansur-i-Zaman, Fidvi-i-Hazrat-i-Malika-i-Mua'zzama-i-Rafi-ud-Darja-i-Inglistan, Maharaja Scindia of Gwalior, GCSI, GCVO
1910-1917: Major-General His Highness Ali Jah, Umdat ul-Umara, Hisam us-Sultanat, Mukhtar ul-Mulk, Azim ul-Iqtidar, Rafi-us-Shan, Wala Shikoh, Muhtasham-i-Dauran, Maharajadhiraj Maharaja Shrimant Sir Madho Rao Scindia Bahadur, Shrinath, Mansur-i-Zaman, Fidvi-i-Hazrat-i-Malika-i-Mua'zzama-i-Rafi-ud-Darja-i-Inglistan, Maharaja Scindia of Gwalior, GCSI, GCVO
1917-1918: Major-General His Highness Ali Jah, Umdat ul-Umara, Hisam us-Sultanat, Mukhtar ul-Mulk, Azim ul-Iqtidar, Rafi-us-Shan, Wala Shikoh, Muhtasham-i-Dauran, Maharajadhiraj Maharaja Shrimant Sir Madho Rao Scindia Bahadur, Shrinath, Mansur-i-Zaman, Fidvi-i-Hazrat-i-Malika-i-Mua'zzama-i-Rafi-ud-Darja-i-Inglistan, Maharaja Scindia of Gwalior, GCSI, GCVO, GBE
1918-1925: Lieutenant-General His Highness Ali Jah, Umdat ul-Umara, Hisam us-Sultanat, Mukhtar ul-Mulk, Azim ul-Iqtidar, Rafi-us-Shan, Wala Shikoh, Muhtasham-i-Dauran, Maharajadhiraj Maharaja Shrimant Sir Madho Rao Scindia Bahadur, Shrinath, Mansur-i-Zaman, Fidvi-i-Hazrat-i-Malika-i-Mua'zzama-i-Rafi-ud-Darja-i-Inglistan, Maharaja Scindia of Gwalior, GCSI, GCVO, GBE

Honours

(ribbon bar, as it would look today; incomplete)

Knight Grand Commander of the Order of the Star of India (GCSI)-1895
Kaisar-i-Hind Medal, 1st Class-1900
China War Medal (1900)-1901
Knight Grand Cross of the Royal Victorian Order (GCVO)-1902
King Edward VII Coronation Medal-1902
Knight Grand Cross of the Order of Philip the Magnanimous of Hesse -1903
Delhi Durbar Gold Medal -1903
King George V Coronation Medal -1911
Bailiff Grand Cross of the Venerable Order of Saint John (GCStJ)-1911
Delhi Durbar Gold Medal -1911
Knight Grand Cross of the Order of the British Empire (GBE)-1917

References

External links
 

1876 births
1925 deaths
19th-century Indian monarchs
20th-century Indian monarchs
Bailiffs Grand Cross of the Order of St John
Knights Grand Commander of the Order of the Star of India
Indian Knights Grand Cross of the Royal Victorian Order
Indian Knights Grand Cross of the Order of the British Empire
Recipients of the Kaisar-i-Hind Medal
Madho Rao